Diego Garcia is an atoll in the Chagos Archipelago, a part of the British Indian Ocean Territory.
 
Diego Garcia may also refer to:

Sports

Association football (soccer)
Diego García (footballer, born 1907), Argentine footballer
Diego García (footballer, born 1986), Argentine footballer
Diego García (footballer, born 1987), Mexican footballer
Diego García (footballer, born 1990), Spanish footballer
Diego García (footballer, born 19 December 1996), Chilean footballer
Diego García (footballer, born 29 December 1996), Uruguayan footballer
Diego Garcia (footballer, born 1997), Portuguese footballer
Diego García (footballer, born 2000), Spanish footballer

Other sports
Diego García (fencer) (1895-?), Spanish fencer
Diego García (sport shooter) (born 1944), Mexican sports shooter
Diego García (runner) (1961–2001), Spanish long-distance athlete
Diego García (basketball) (born 1979), Argentine professional basketball player
Diego García (taekwondo) (born 1990), Mexican taekwondo practitioner
Diego García (racewalker) (born 1996), Spanish race walker

Others
Diego García de Paredes (1466–1534), Spanish soldier and duellist
Diego García de Moguer (1484–1544), Spanish explorer
Diego García de Paredes (conquistador) (1506–1563), Spanish conquistador
Diego José Abad y García (1727–1779), Jesuit poet and translator in Italy and New Spain
Francisco García Diego y Moreno (often erroneously known as Diego Garcia, 1785–1846), Roman Catholic bishop in California
Diego García Sayán (born 1950), Peruvian lawyer and politician, former foreign minister
Diego García (actor) (born 1983), Argentine actor
Diego Garcia (economist), American economist
Diego Garcia (musician), American musician, leader of the band Elefant

Other uses
Diego Garcia (novel), 2022 novel by Natasha Soobramanien and Luke Williams

Garcia, Diego